Cleonaeus was a Rhodian admiral. He was second-in-command to Theophiliscus at the Battle of Chios, and he became commander after  Theophilscius died from his wounds. As he was sailing back to Rhodes, he was defeated by Philip V of Macedon at the Battle of Lade.

References

Polybius. The Rise of the Roman Empire. 

3rd-century BC Rhodians
Ancient Rhodian admirals